Rocket Cargo is a United States Space Force program run through the Air Force Research Laboratory for suborbital spaceflight rocket-delivered cargo involving point-to-point space travel. The program is to develop the capability to rapidly send cargo anywhere in the world on a rocket. It would involve reusable rockets that can perform propulsive landings on a variety of landing sites, to deliver a C-17's worth of cargo in an hour. The program was discussed in 2020 and announced in 2021, with a budget allocation request for Fiscal Year 2022.

History
In the 1960s, the military studied using Douglas Ithacus T-100 rockets to rocket off aircraft carriers to deliver marines to theatres.

In 2018, the Air Force started studying delivering cargo via rockets.
In 2020, U.S. Transportation Command consulted with SpaceX on the delivery of 100-tons of cargo via rocket anywhere in the world in under 1 hour with Starship.
In 2021, the Pentagon announced the Rocket Cargo program, with the U.S. Space Force as the lead service on the program. $9.7 million U.S. dollars were allocated to Rocket Cargo in FY21.
The Pentagon Budget Office has requested $48 million US for FY 2022 for the program.
In 2022, the Department of the Air Force awarded a $102 million, 5-year contract to SpaceX to demonstrate technologies and capabilities to transport military cargo and humanitarian aid around the world.

Objectives
The program is an Air Force Research Laboratory "Vanguard" program, a top importance science and technology research and development program. At the time of announcement, it was one of four such programs for the United States Department of the Air Force. The program is to examine modifying existing commercially available hardware for the program objectives. It would use a propulsively-landing reusable rocket that would transport cargo from source to destination, landing in all kinds of environments.

References

Further reading

See also

 Prompt Global Strike
 rocket mail—delivery of mail by rocket

Air Force Research Laboratory projects
United States Space Force
SpaceX